This is a list of the National Register of Historic Places listings in Denali Borough, Alaska.

This is intended to be a complete list of the properties and districts on the National Register of Historic Places in Denali Borough, Alaska, United States.  The locations of National Register properties and districts for which the latitude and longitude coordinates are included below, may be seen in an online map.

There are 22 properties and districts listed on the National Register in the borough, including 1 National Historic Landmark. Another property was once listed but has been removed.

Eighteen of the properties are in Denali National Park.

Current listings

|}

Former listings

|}

See also 

 List of National Historic Landmarks in Alaska
 National Register of Historic Places listings in Alaska

References

 
Denali